Articulations  of Tamil-phonemes are discussed here based on Tolkappiyam.

Propelling air in mouth makes sound if articulated. The least part of human language is phoneme. It varies in languages. Generally some points in the mouth and nose help to propel phoneme.
 
Tamil phonemes are thirty. They are 12 vowels and 18 consonants.   Tolkappiyam, the earliest Tamil classical work defines scientifically the positions and functions of the speech organs, which produce phonemes.

Speech organs and their functions
Raising wind starts from diaphragm. On the way it touches 8 vocal organs. Head the oral cavity, pharynx, larynx are the three places where they touch. Teeth, lip, tongue, nose and palate are the five places where they play before producing voice. According to modern science the larynx or voice box is the anchor of vocal folds. It impedes the airflow from the lungs to create vocal folds. A periodic cycle in speech organs produces phonemes.

Vowels in Tamil
 All the 12 vowels vibrate (buzz) through larynx
 Vowels a and aa, are articulated in vocal cavity along with a vibration
 Vowels /i, i:, e, e:, ai/ (5 in total) are articulated while edge of the tongue moving towards the gum of teeth.
 Vowels /u, u:, o, o:, au/ (5 in total) are articulated while rounding lips.
 There is a slight change in articulation between short and long vowels.

Consonants in Tamil
 Consonants /k/ and [ŋ] articulate at the back of the tongue and palate.
 Consonants /t͡ʃ/ and /ɲ/ articulate at the middle of the tongue and palate.
 Consonants /ʈ/ and /ɳ/ articulate at the front of the tongue and palate.
 These six characters have three kinds of articulations.
 Consonants /t̪/ and /n̪/ articulate while the front of the tongue flies and touches the palate near the gum of the teeth.
 Consonants /r/ and [n] articulate while the front lower portion of the tongue touches the front portion of the palate.
 Consonants /ɾ/ and /ɻ/ articulate while the lower portion of the tongue fondles the front portion of the palate.
 Consonant /l/ articulates while the blubbing action of the edge of the tongue presses the gum of teeth and consonant /ɭ/ articulates in the same way but the movement is touching. It is fondling the gum of the teeth.
 Consonants /p/ and /m/ articulate on lips touching each other.
 Consonant /ʋ/ articulates while lip and teeth touches each other.
 Consonant /j/ articulates while air fondling the palate.
 Soft consonants [ŋ], /ɲ/, /ɳ/, /n̪/ /m/ and [n] propel along with nasal articulation.

Dependant phonemes in Tamil
 Shorted /i/ and /u/ and softened /h/ (ஃ) have no separate articulation. They articulate as their primaries.

Conclusion
 All the explanations regarding air, positions and articulations defined in the chapter are external manifestations. Tholkaappiyar points out that the internal manifestations were already well defined in a book written by experts (Anthan’ar). He adds that only the articulations felt by organs is covered.

Footnotes

References 

 Tolkappiyam (Tamil original with the commentary of Iḷampūraṇar, தொல்காப்பியம் இளம்பூரணர் உரை)
 Tholkappiyam (in English) S. Ilakkuvanar, Kural Neri Publishing House, Madurai – 6, year 1963
 Tolkappiyam in English, by Dr. V. Murugan, Project Director Dr. G. John Samuel, Institute of Asian Studies, Chennai, India, 2000.

Tamil